The 12451 / 12452 Shram Shakti Express  is an Indian Railways Superfast train which daily runs non-stop overnight between the cities of Kanpur and . It covers the 440 km of distance in 6 hours and has a priority advantage over other trains.

Shram Shakti Express along with Prayagraj Express and Shiv Ganga Express enjoys highest priority all over the route.

Modern LHB coach with a MPS of 160 kmph are more comfortable. The new coaches, based on a German technology Linke Hoffman Busch, are made of stainless steel which do not turn turtle during accidents; the light-weight coaches will improve the train's speed. Bigger windows, lamps at all AC seats and sound insulation are the other facilities of this train. Shram Shakti Express runs with 1 AC 1 tier coach, 1 AC 2 tier coaches, 2 AC 3E coaches,4 AC 3 tier coaches, 7 Sleeper coaches, 5 General coaches along with 2 EOG coaches. Thus, having a total of 22 LHB coach; the normal locomotive of Shram Shakti is a WAP-7 locomotive of Kanpur shed. Loco in-charge for this train is WAP-7 Kanpur Shed.Earlier was hauled by a WAP-4 Kanpur Shed. Earlier It was used to run non stop over night between New Delhi and Kanpur Central, but it had given a halt at Panki in Kanpur. It is non-stop overnight train. Punctual and clean also; this along with Kanpur Shatabdi are two trains from/to NDLS-CNB.

Background 
The train has two dedicated LHB rakes. Shram Shakti Express and Kanpur–New Delhi Shatabdi Express are two dedicated intercity trains between New Delhi (NDLS) and Kanpur Central (CNB).

Development 
On 29 July 2018, replacing the old ICF coaches, Shram Shakti Express got new German LHB rakes. Modern LHB coach are more comfortable and at the same time faster than the conventional ICF coaches.

Coaches 
Shram Shakti Express runs with,

AC First class coach, 
2 AC 3E coaches
AC 2 tier coach, 
4 AC 3 tier coaches, 
7 Sleeper coaches, 
5 Unreserved coaches,  
1 EOG coach
1 SLR coach
Thus, having a total of 22 LHB coach.

Traction
It is regularly hauled by a Kanpur-based WAP-7 locomotive from end to end.

Coach composition 
Coach composition are as follows(for 12452)-

And for 12451 it is the reverse.

External links
Shram Shakti Express (Kanpur to New Delhi)
Shram Shakti Express (New Delhi to Kanpur)

Named passenger trains of India
Rail transport in Delhi
Rail transport in Uttar Pradesh
Railway services introduced in 2002
Transport in Delhi
Transport in Kanpur
Express trains in India